Gregory Richard Paterra (born May 12, 1967) is a former American football running back who played one season with the Atlanta Falcons of the National Football League (NFL). He was drafted by the Falcons in the eleventh round of the 1989 NFL Draft. He first enrolled at Harford Community College before transferring to Slippery Rock University of Pennsylvania. Paterra attended Elizabeth Forward High School in Elizabeth, Pennsylvania. He was also a member of the Buffalo Bills.

References

External links
Just Sports Stats

Living people
1967 births
Players of American football from Pennsylvania
American football running backs
African-American players of American football
Slippery Rock football players
Atlanta Falcons players
Sportspeople from McKeesport, Pennsylvania
21st-century African-American people
20th-century African-American sportspeople